The Chewonki Foundation is a non-profit institution in Wiscasset, Maine which runs educational programs with an environmental focus.

Background

Founded in 1915 as a summer camp for boys, the Foundation now runs a four-month high school program—Maine Coast Semester at Chewonki, boys and girls summer camp programs, wilderness trips for teenagers and families, an organic farm, traveling natural history programs where non-releasable wildlife are brought to schools and libraries, as well as week-long environmental education programs for school groups around New England.

The Chewonki Foundation is located on a  peninsula between Westport Island and the town of Woolwich. The peninsula protrudes into Montsweag Bay. The foundation is also a steward of the former Debsconeag Lake camps on Fourth Debsconeag Lake, and the owners of the public Big Eddy Campground off the Golden Road. With their off-site, program-specific properties, Chewonki took possession of several islands in Mid-Coast Maine to keep them available for public access.

References

External links
 Chewonki Foundation

Non-profit organizations based in Maine
Summer camps in Maine
Conservation and environmental foundations in the United States
Organizations established in 1915
1915 establishments in Maine
Education in Lincoln County, Maine
Buildings and structures in Wiscasset, Maine